Itzhak Arnon (born Isaac Aharonowitz; 1909–2005) was an Israeli agronomist. Arnon was born in Antwerp (Belgium). He studied agronomy at Gembloux Agro-Bio Tech. In 1932, Itzhak Arnon immigrated to Palestine.

In 1933, he was appointed inspector of the Agricultural Experimental Station of the Mandatory Government in Acre. In 1948, he established the agricultural station at Neve Yaar.

In 1957, he obtained his PhD from the Hebrew University of Jerusalem. From 1958 to 1968, Itzhak Arnon headed the Volcani Institute of Agricultural Research. In 1971, he received the Israel Prize in agriculture. From 1971, he was a member of the Académie d'Agriculture.

Selected publications

References

Israeli agronomists
Israel Prize in agriculture recipients
2005 deaths
1909 births
Hebrew University of Jerusalem alumni
Belgian emigrants to Mandatory Palestine
20th-century agronomists